is the 12th single by Japanese entertainer Akina Nakamori. Written by Eiko Kyo and Takashi Tsushimi, the single was released on June 19, 1985, by Warner Pioneer through the Reprise label. It was also the lead single from her second compilation album Best.

Background 
The theme of "Sand Beige (Sabaku e)" is a farewell trip, with the lyrics based on travel photos and tour guide books that Nakamori collected over the years. The foreign lyrics written in katakana are in Egyptian Arabic. The jacket photo was taken in Manila.

Nakamori has re-recorded "Sand Beige (Sabaku e)" for the 2002 self-cover compilation Utahime Double Decade.

Chart performance 
"Sand Beige (Sabaku e)" became Nakamori's ninth No. 1 on Oricon's weekly singles chart and sold over 460,700 copies.

Track listing 
All music is arranged by Akira Inoue.

Charts

References

External links 
 
 
 

1985 singles
1985 songs
Akina Nakamori songs
Japanese-language songs
Warner Music Japan singles
Reprise Records singles
Oricon Weekly number-one singles